Anthony Edward Green (born September 26, 1956) is an American former professional football player who was a kickoff returner and running back in the National Football League (NFL) for two seasons during the late 1970s.  Green played college football for the University of Florida, and thereafter, he played professionally for the Washington Redskins, New York Giants and Seattle Seahawks of the NFL.

Early years 

Green was born in Rochester, New York in 1956.  He attended  Riverview High School in Sarasota, Florida, and he played high school football for the Riverview Rams.

College career 

Green accepted an athletic scholarship to attend the University of Florida in Gainesville, Florida, where he played for coach Doug Dickey's Florida Gators football team from 1974 to 1977.  Memorably, he rushed eleven times for 178 yards (a 16.2-yard average) against the Maryland Terrapins in 1974, and ran eighty yards for a touchdown against the Mississippi State Bulldogs in 1977.  He was a first-team All-Southeastern Conference (SEC) selection as a senior in 1977.  Green finished his four-year college career with 2,590 rushing yards on 445 carries (a 5.8-yard average), 287 yards receiving, and 775 yards in punt and kickoff returns.

Professional career 

He had a remarkable rookie season as the Redskins' primary kick return specialist in : forty-two punt return for 440 yards, and thirty-four kickoff returns for 870 yards. Green was selected for the Pro Bowl as a kick returner after the season ended.

See also 

 Florida Gators football, 1970–79
 List of Florida Gators in the NFL Draft
 List of New York Giants players
 List of Seattle Seahawks players
 List of Washington Redskins players

References

Bibliography 

 Carlson, Norm, University of Florida Football Vault: The History of the Florida Gators, Whitman Publishing, LLC, Atlanta, Georgia (2007).  .
 Golenbock, Peter, Go Gators!  An Oral History of Florida's Pursuit of Gridiron Glory, Legends Publishing, LLC, St. Petersburg, Florida (2002).  .
 Hairston, Jack, Tales from the Gator Swamp: A Collection of the Greatest Gator Stories Ever Told, Sports Publishing, LLC, Champaign, Illinois (2002).  .
 McCarthy, Kevin M.,  Fightin' Gators: A History of University of Florida Football, Arcadia Publishing, Mount Pleasant, South Carolina (2000).  .
 Nash, Noel, ed., The Gainesville Sun Presents The Greatest Moments in Florida Gators Football, Sports Publishing, Inc., Champaign, Illinois (1998).  

1956 births
Living people
American football return specialists
American football running backs
Florida Gators football players
National Conference Pro Bowl players
New York Giants players
Sportspeople from Sarasota, Florida
Seattle Seahawks players
Sportspeople from Rochester, New York
Washington Redskins players
Riverview High School (Sarasota, Florida) alumni